Cook Islands competed at the 2020 Summer Olympics in Tokyo. Originally scheduled to take place from 24 July to 9 August 2020, the Games were postponed to 23 July to 8 August 2021, because of the COVID-19 pandemic. It was the nation's ninth consecutive appearance at the Summer Olympics.

Competitors
The following is the list of number of competitors in the Games.

Athletics

Cook Islands has received universality slots from IAAF to send a male track and field athlete to the Olympics.

Track & road events

Canoeing

Slalom
Cook Islands qualified one canoeist in the women's K-1 class by finishing as the 16th ranked eligible NOC at the 2019 ICF Canoe Slalom World Championships in La Seu d'Urgell, Spain.

Sprint 
Canoeists from the Cook Islands qualified two boats in each of the following distances for the Games through the 2020 Oceania Championships in Penrith, New South Wales.

Qualification Legend: FA = Qualify to final A (medal); FB = Qualify to final B (non-medal)

Swimming 

Cook Islands qualified two swimmers in three events.

References

Nations at the 2020 Summer Olympics
2020
2020 in the Cook Islands